The Village 'Neath the Sea is a 1914 American silent short adventure film directed by Thomas H. Ince and Jay Hunt. Sessue Hayakawa, Tsuru Aoki, Lone Bear and Ernest Swallow played important roles in it.

References

External links 

 

American silent short films
American black-and-white films
American adventure films
1914 adventure films
Films directed by Thomas H. Ince
Films directed by Jay Hunt
1910s American films
Silent adventure films